Composer Inna Abramovna Zhvanetskaya was born in Vinnytsia, Ukraine, on 20 January 1937 or 20 January 1939.  She studied composition under Nikolay Peyko at the Gnessin School where she graduated in 1964.  She taught piano and in 1965 became a lecturer in score-reading and instrumentation at the Gnessin School (today the Gnessin State Musical College).

Work 
Zhvanetskaya's compositions include:

Chamber 
 Burlesque (violin and piano; 1959)
 Five Dance Pieces for Children (two cellos; 2007)
 La Bale (viola and piano; 2015)
 Memories of the Composer Alfred Schnittke (solo cello)
 Six Pieces (wind quintet; 1969)
 Violin Sonata (1976)
 Splinters of Childhood (solo violin)
 String Quartet (1962)
 Variations on a Jewish Theme (two violins)

Orchestral 
 Double Bass Concerto (with piano reduction; 1978) 
 Overture (1963)
 Piano Concerto
 Suite (string orchestra; 1965)

Piano 
 Partita (1966)
 Polyphonic Fantasy (1962)
 Toccata (1961)
 Variations on a Theme of Brahms (1958)

Vocal 
 Cycle (words by A. Izaakian; voice and piano; 1960)
 From Medieval Hebrew Poetry (1998)
 Loud Songs of Anna Akhmatova
 Romances (words by V. Bryusov and other unspecified poets)
 Yanvarski Stroki (words by S. Smirnov; voice and piano; 1968)
 Zemiyai! (words by Tvorenye-Cholovek; chorus and orchestra; 1972)

References 

1930s births
Living people
Women composers
Ukrainian composers
Ukrainian women musicians
Gnessin State Musical College alumni
Musicians from Vinnytsia